Roland George Dwight Richardson (born May 14, 1878, Dartmouth, Nova Scotia; died July 17, 1949, Antigonish, Nova Scotia) was a prominent Canadian-American mathematician chiefly known for his work building the math department at Brown University and as Secretary of the American Mathematical Society.

Early life
Richardson was the son of George J. Richardson (1828–1898), a teacher, and Rebecca Newcomb Richardson (1837–1923). The family lived in several different towns in Nova Scotia during Richardson's youth. After completing high school, Richardson taught school in the small village of Margaretsville, Nova Scotia. In 1896 Richardson entered Acadia University; after graduating in 1898, he returned to his teaching job in Margaretsville. From 1899 to 1902 he was the principal of the high school in tiny Westport, Nova Scotia. There he met his future wife Louise MacHattie, whom he married in 1908.

Career in mathematics
In 1902 Richardson entered Yale University, earning an AB in 1903 and a Masters in 1904. He became an Instructor at Yale in the Math department and began research under Professor James Pierpont. In 1906 Richardson was awarded a PhD by Yale for his thesis on "Improper Multiple Integrals". In 1907 he was appointed assistant professor of mathematics at Brown University, with the stipulation that he first spend a study year in Gottingen, Germany. By 1915 Richardson had become a full professor and the head of the mathematics department at Brown. In 1926 he was also given the position of Dean of the Graduate School at Brown. Under Roland's leadership Brown's graduate program was recognized when Brown was elected to the elite Association of American Universities in 1933.

Richardson was the Secretary of the American Mathematical Society in 1921 and held the job until 1940. During his time, Raymond Clare Archibald wrote in his article on Richardson, "No American mathematician was more widely known among his colleagues and the careers of scores of them were notably promoted by his time-consuming activities in their behalf." He was credited with helping many European mathematicians concerned about conditions in Europe move to America during the 1930s.

At the start of World War II Richardson organized accelerated applied mathematics courses at Brown for servicemen as the "Program of Advanced Instruction and Research in Applied Mechanics", recruiting German mathematician William Prager to lead it. This led to the founding of a new "Quarterly of Applied Mathematics" edited at Brown in 1943. After the war the program was converted into a new graduate division of applied mathematics. From 1943 to 1946 he was a member of the applied mathematics panel of the National Defense Research Committee.

Family and death
Richardson died while on a fishing trip to his native Nova Scotia and was buried in Camp Hill Cemetery in Halifax.

Richardson and his wife had one child, George Webdell Richardson (b. July 7, 1920).

Recognition
Richardson received a number of honorary degrees. Acadia University awarded him a Doctor of Civil Law in 1931, Lehigh University gave him an LLD in 1941, and Brown University an LLD on his retirement in 1948. Richardson was elected a member of the American Academy of Arts and Sciences in 1914 and served as vice president 1945–9.

References

1878 births
1949 deaths
Brown University faculty
Canadian expatriates in the United States
Canadian mathematicians
People from Dartmouth, Nova Scotia
Yale University alumni
20th-century American mathematicians